The Maridan were an indigenous Australian people of the Northern Territory.

Language
Maridan belongs to the Western branch of the Daly River language family

Country

Alternative names
 Murindan.

Notes

Citations

Sources

Aboriginal peoples of the Northern Territory